The Pokhara Baglung highway is a  stretch of road that begins at Zero Kilometer, Pokhara, and ends in the municipality of Baglung in Gandaki Province, Nepal. It is part of the Government of Nepal's 1095 km Midhill Highway Project.

References

Highways in Nepal